F.C. Porto Superleague Formula team was the racing team of F.C. Porto, a football team that competes in Portugal in the Portuguese Liga. F.C. Porto racing team competed in the Superleague Formula. They were operated by Alan Docking Racing in the 2008 season, by Hitech Junior Team in the 2009 season and by Atech GP/Reid Motorsport in the 2010 season.

2008 season
In the 2008 Superleague Formula season F.C. Porto finished 7th overall in the table with 277 points. French driver Tristan Gommendy was the F.C. Porto driver for all rounds, winning one race in the 2008 Vallelunga round.

2009 season
For the 2009 Superleague Formula season, Tristan Gommendy was confirmed as the driver once again, but this time together with Álvaro Parente the team finished 5th overall in the table with 302 points.

2010 season
F.C. Porto returned for the 2010 Superleague Formula season with Álvaro Parente and Earl Bamber as the drivers. They finished 7th overall with 495 points.

Record
(key)

2008

2009
Super Final results in 2009 did not count for points towards the main championship.

2010

References

External links
 F.C. Porto Superleague Formula team minisite
 Official F.C. Porto football club website

FC Porto
Superleague Formula club teams
2008 establishments in Portugal